Huang Shisong was a Chinese meteorologist.

Huang hails from Jinhua, Zhejiang. There he received his initial education, then he was admitted to the Department of Aeronautical Engineer of then National Central University in 1938. However, the infection of one of his fingers limited his manual dexterity, he switched over to geography. As one of first graduates of Meteorology,  he received his degree in 1942. Later, he studied at University of Chicago and UCLA, under Carl-Gustaf Rossby and Jacob Bjerknes's guidance successively. For unknown reason, he dropped out his PhD course, returned to mainland China and taught at Nanjing University.

Huang led Department of Meteorology, Nanjing University from 1977 to 1983. He focused on the circulation in low-latitudes and the monsoon circulation of East Asia. He was the Honorary President of Chinese Meteorological Society.

Huang died on 11 November 2017.

References 

1919 births
2017 deaths
Chinese meteorologists
Academic staff of Nanjing University
University of Chicago alumni
University of California, Los Angeles alumni
Nanjing University alumni
Chinese expatriates in the United States
People from Jinhua